A special election was held in  October 10–11, 1814 to fill a vacancy left by the death of Jacob Hufty (F) on May 20, 1814.

Election results

Bines took his seat on November 2, 1814

See also
List of special elections to the United States House of Representatives

References

Special elections to the 13th United States Congress
1814
New Jersey 1814 03
1814 New Jersey elections
New Jersey 03
United States House of Representatives 1814 03